Nuevo Zoquiapam  is a town and municipality in Oaxaca in south-western Mexico. The municipality covers an area of 74 km². 
It is part of the Ixtlán District in the Sierra Norte de Oaxaca region.

As of 2005, the municipality had a total population of 1486.

References

Municipalities of Oaxaca